Moasseseh-ye Hajj Hamudamari (also Romanized as Moasseseh-ye Ḩājj Ḩamūdʿāmarī) is a village in Mollasani Rural District, in the Central District of Bavi County, Khuzestan Province, Iran. At the 2006 census, its population was 81, in 15 families.

References 

Populated places in Bavi County